Luciano Roberto Borsato (born January 7, 1966) is a Canadian former professional ice hockey player. Borsato played five seasons in the National Hockey League for the Winnipeg Jets.

Playing career
Borsato was drafted in the 7th round, 135th overall by the Winnipeg Jets in the 1984 NHL Entry Draft. He grew up in Bramalea, Ontario and played Junior "B" hockey with the Bramalea Blues. He played collegiate hockey at Clarkson University from 1984 to 1988, and then played for the Moncton Hawks. He was recalled to the Winnipeg Jets for one game in the 1990-1991 season, and played the bulk of the subsequent  season with the team. By 1995, he was playing in European leagues, where he would finish his career, having played for the Kölner Haie, HIFK, HC Davos and the Nuermberg Ice Tigers.

Career statistics

Regular season and playoffs

International

Awards and honors

References

External links
 

1966 births
Living people
Canadian expatriate ice hockey players in Finland
Canadian expatriate ice hockey players in Germany
Canadian expatriate ice hockey players in Switzerland
Canadian sportspeople of Italian descent
Canadian ice hockey centres
Clarkson Golden Knights men's ice hockey players
HC Davos players
HIFK (ice hockey) players
Ice hockey people from Ontario
Kölner Haie players
Moncton Hawks players
Nürnberg Ice Tigers players
Sportspeople from Brampton
Sportspeople from Richmond Hill, Ontario
Springfield Falcons players
Tappara players
Winnipeg Jets (1979–1996) draft picks
Winnipeg Jets (1979–1996) players
AHCA Division I men's ice hockey All-Americans